William Crump or Crompe (born by 1479 – 1516 or later), of Canterbury, Kent, was an English politician.

Career
Crump was a common councilman of Canterbury by 1500, chamberlain in 1503–1505, an alderman by 1505 and Mayor of Canterbury for 1505–06 and 1509–10. He was elected a Member of Parliament for Canterbury, Kent in 1510.

References

Year of birth missing
Year of death missing
15th-century births
16th-century deaths
People from Canterbury
English MPs 1510
Mayors of Canterbury